The Surat Basin Railway is a proposed  freight railway in Queensland, Australia.

The aim of the project is to facilitate the export of coal from the developing Surat Basin and freight through to the Port of Gladstone. The proposal is still in the feasibility stage and is being developed by The Surat Basin Railway Joint Venture, which comprises the Australian Transport and Energy Corridor Pty Ltd (ATEC), Xstrata Coal and Queensland Rail (QR). It is estimated that it will cost up to A$1.2 billion and employ a workforce of up to 600 over a -year construction period.

The project was often previously referred to as the "Southern Missing Link". Due to global market conditions and the status of other infrastructure and mining projects in the region, the timeframe for the construction of the railway is still to be finalised.

See also

Construction of Queensland railways

References

External links
Surat Basin Rail website

Railway lines in Queensland
Proposed railway lines in Australia
Xstrata